There have been two classes of destroyers built for the Italian navies named Audace:

, two ships, both launched in 1913
, two ships, both launched in 1971

See also
, a third destroyer of the same name built to a unique design